Rotorua Lakes High School, commonly known as Lakes High, or simply Lakes, is a state school educating boys and girls from Year 9 to Year 13. It is situated in Owhata, in the eastern suburbs of Rotorua, New Zealand, and draws many of its students from the eastern Rotorua urban area, and the semi-rural lakes communities to the south and east of Rotorua; this giving rise to the name Rotorua Lakes.

The school has a roll of 706 students from year 9 to 13. It offers the National Certificate of Educational Achievement qualification, alongside New Zealand Scholarship. Opened in 1971, the school is the youngest secondary school in Rotorua and is built in the "S68" style common for secondary schools in New Zealand in this period. Special features of the school include a special needs unit, Astroturf, squash court and horticulture complex.

About the school

Buildings

Much of the school is built in the "S68" style common for school buildings built in the period 1968 to 1978, featuring single-storey blocks of rooms with cinderblock concrete construction, low-pitched roofs and internal courtyards.

Buildings in the school include standard classroom and administrative blocks, as well as blocks for science, technology, the library, and music. The school's hall is known as the D.C. Price Auditorium in honour of the school's foundation principal.

The school also has a wharenui, a purpose-built Health and Wellness Centre, a special needs education centre, gymnasium and netball courts, squash courts, and an Astroturf for hockey, tennis, netball and other sports.

Principals
 Des Price 1971-1986
 Frank Solomon 1987-1989
 Dave Randell 1989-1995?
 John Ellis 1995-2007
 Peter Bruce Walker 2008-2019
 Jon Ward 2019–present

Symbols
The school colours of Rotorua Lakes High School are navy blue, teal and gold. The school logo is a stylised waha ika (traditional Māori weapon), which contains a map of all of the lakes in the Rotorua District. The school motto is in Māori, "Mauria Te Pono" which translates in English as "Keep Steadfastly to the Truth".

Houses
Rotorua Lakes High School has four houses, each named after one of the many lakes in the Rotorua area. Each house has its own House Colour, as follows:

Students

As of March 2019, the school has 706 students from years 9 to 13. The school has seen a general roll increase since 2011. This number includes 9 international students, mostly from China. The student body is currently around 47% Māori, 45% European, and 6% of other ethnic backgrounds including Pacific and Asian.

Curricular and co-curricular

Academic
The school offers NCEA Levels 1, 2 and 3 at Year 11, 12 and 13 respectively, in a range of subjects. NZ Scholarship is offered to able Year 13 students in some subjects. Junior students participate in a varied programme, which follows the New Zealand Curriculum. The school has an annual academic exchange with Forest View High School, in Tokoroa, in the subjects of Debating, Mathematics, General Knowledge, Economics, Science and Visual Arts.

Achievement rates for NCEA Levels 1–3, for both Māori and non-Māori students, are broadly in line with national averages.

Cultural
Rotorua Lakes High School is a regular participant in a number of cultural events. These include Kapa Haka, Stage Challenge, Shakespeare in Schools, Cyril Bassett-RSA Speech Competition, Manu Korero and others. The school also organises regular overseas trips for senior students who study particular subjects. In particular, the regular trip to Europe, usually including France and Italy runs every three or four years for senior students of French, History, Geography, Classics and Tourism.

Sport
The school fields individuals and teams in a wide range of sports. Individual sports on offer include athletics and cross country, swimming, mountain biking, cycling, and orienteering.

Alumni
 Erena Mikaere - New Zealand netball international.

References

External links
 Official website
 2016 Education Review Office (ERO) Report
 2013 Education Review Office (ERO) Report
 Ministry of Education Profile

Schools in Rotorua
Secondary schools in the Bay of Plenty Region
New Zealand secondary schools of S68 plan construction
1971 establishments in New Zealand
Educational institutions established in 1971